Gaila Ceneida González López (born 25 June 1997) is a Dominican Republic volleyball player. She competed in the 2020 Summer Olympics.

Awards

Individual

 2022 Pan American Cup "Best Opposite"
 2021 NORCECA Championship "Best Opposite"
 2021 NORCECA Championship "Best Scorer"
 2021 NORCECA Championship "Most Valuable Player"
 2021 Pan-American Cup "Best Server"
 2021 Women's NORCECA Champions Cup "Best Opposite"
 2017 NORCECA Championship "Best Opposite"

External links
 Volleybox.Net Profile

References

1997 births
Living people
Volleyball players at the 2020 Summer Olympics
Dominican Republic women's volleyball players
Olympic volleyball players of the Dominican Republic
Pan American Games medalists in volleyball
Pan American Games gold medalists for the Dominican Republic
Volleyball players at the 2019 Pan American Games
Medalists at the 2019 Pan American Games